Crime in Nigeria is investigated by the Nigerian Police. Nigeria is considered to be a country with a high level of crime, ranking 17th among the least peaceful countries in the world. During the first half of 2022, almost 6,000 people were killed by jihadists, kidnappers, bandits or the Nigerian army.

Crime by type

Child sexual abuse 

According to UNICEF in 2014, 25% of women were sexually abused before age 18 and 11% of men were sexually abused before age 18.

Corruption 

In 2011, it was estimated that Nigeria had lost over $400 billion to political corruption since independence.

Domestic violence 

A 2012 study found that 31% of Nigerian women had been victims of domestic violence. Nigerian perceptions of domestic violence vary based on region, religion, and class. For example, the Tiv people view wife-beating as a "sign of love" that should be encouraged as evidenced with the statement "If you are not yet beaten by your husband then you do not know the joy of marriage and that means you are not yet married".

All the major ethnic groups, especially Yoruba and Igbo, have strong patriarchial societal structures that lead to the justification of domestic violence.

Human trafficking 

Nigeria is a source, transit, and destination country for women and children subjected to trafficking, including forced labour and forced prostitution. Trafficked Nigerian women and children are recruited from rural areas within Nigeria - women and girls for involuntary domestic servitude and sexual exploitation, and boys for forced labour in street vending, domestic servitude, mining, and begging.

Nigerian women and children are taken from Nigeria to other West and Central African countries, primarily Gabon, Cameroon, Ghana, Chad, Benin, Togo, Niger, Burkina Faso, and the Gambia, for the same purposes. Children from West African states like Benin, Togo, and Ghana – where Economic Community of West African States (ECOWAS) rules allow for easy entry – are also forced to work in Nigeria, and some are subjected to hazardous jobs in Nigeria's granite mines. Nigerian women and girls are taken to Europe, especially to Italy and Russia, and to the Middle East and North Africa, for forced prostitution.

Kidnapping

Money laundering

Murder 

Nigeria had a murder rate of 9.85 per 100,000 population in 2015. In 2016, the homicide rate per 100.000 inhabitants was 34.5.

Organised crime 

Criminal organisations in Nigeria typically do not follow the mafia-type model used elsewhere. They appear to be less formal and more organised along familial and ethnic lines, thus making them less susceptible to infiltration by law enforcement. Police investigations are further hampered by the fact there are at least 250 distinct ethnic languages in Nigeria.

Area boys are loosely organised gangs of street children and teenagers, composed mostly of males, who roam the streets of Lagos, Lagos State in Nigeria. They extort money from passers-by, public transporters and traders, sell illegal drugs, act as informal security guards, and perform other "odd jobs" in return for compensation.

Piracy

Prison escapes

Terrorism 

Jihadist group Boko Haram began an insurgency in July 2009, which peaked in the mid-2010s. Centred on Maiduguri, Borno State, they have killed carried out many attacks in Nigeria, Niger, Cameroon and Chad. They have carried out many kidnappings, bombings and massacres - killing tens of thousands of people.

In September 2019, Islamic State of Iraq and the Levant stated that it killed 14 Nigerian soldiers in Borno. Later in September 2019, militants in northeastern Nigeria killed at least nine people in an attack. A day later, ISIL claimed responsibility for the attack.

In January 2021, a separatist insurgency in the country's southeast began.

References

See also 
 Law enforcement in Nigeria